The 2006 Minnesota gubernatorial election took place on November 7, 2006. Incumbent Tim Pawlenty was endorsed by the state Republican convention on June 2, 2006, while the state Democratic–Farmer–Labor convention endorsed Mike Hatch on June 10, 2006. The party primaries took place on September 12, 2006, with Hatch defeating DFL challengers Becky Lourey and Ole Savior and incumbent Pawlenty defeating Sue Jeffers. In the November 7 general election, Pawlenty received a plurality of the votes, defeating Hatch by a margin of 1%. As a result, this election was the closest race of the 2006 gubernatorial election cycle.

As of 2022, it is the last time a Republican won a statewide race in Minnesota.

Democratic–Farmer–Labor primary

Candidates

Declared
 Mike Hatch, 28th Minnesota Attorney General since 1999, former Minnesota Commissioner of Commerce (1983–89), and former State Party Chair of the Minnesota Democratic–Farmer–Labor Party (1980–83). Hatch received the strongest support of all candidates in the statewide caucus straw poll, and continued to hold his lead into the party convention, in which he received the endorsement after seven ballots. Hatch's running mate was 18th Minnesota State Auditor (since 1995) Judi Dutcher.
 Becky Lourey, State Senator from senate district 8 since 1997, former State Representative from legislative districts 8B (1993–97) and 14B (1991–93), businesswoman, activist, and homemaker. Lourey lost the DFL endorsement race to Mike Hatch, but continued to seek the DFL nomination in the primary election. Her running mate was businessman, former NFL defensive back (1976–79), and former Minneapolis Planning Commission member (1992–2001) Tim Baylor.
 Ole Savior, artist and perennial candidate. At the DFL state convention, Savior was eliminated on the first ballot for the party endorsement, after winning just one vote out of 1,500, but he continued to seek the nomination in the primary. Savior's running mate was Dan Fischer.

Withdrawn
 Kelly Doran, real estate developer. Doran withdrew his candidacy on March 24, 2006.
 Steve Kelley, State Senator from senate district 44 since 1997, former State Representative from legislative district 44A (1993–97), and attorney. Kelley withdrew his candidacy on June 10, 2006, after failing to defeat Hatch in the endorsement fight, throwing his support behind Hatch's campaign.
 Bud Philbrook, former State Representative from legislative district 48B (1975–77), non-profit executive director, and attorney. Philbrook withdrew his candidacy on October 24, 2005.

Results

Independence primary

Candidates
 Pam Ellison, 2000 congressional candidate, former gubernatorial aide, and consultant. Ellison's running mate was Kari Johnson.
 Peter Hutchinson, former Minnesota Commissioner of Finance (1989–91), former Superintendent of Minneapolis Public Schools (1993–97), and consultant. Hutchinson won the Independence Party straw poll in March, and was endorsed at the June 24 convention. Hutchinson's running mate was physician and former University of Minnesota Board of Regents member (1997–2005) and chair (2001–03) Maureen Reed.

Results

Republican primary

Candidates
 Sue Jeffers, Minneapolis bar owner and noted opponent of smoking bans and non-public use of eminent domain. A self-described Libertarian Republican, Jeffers was also endorsed by the Libertarian Party (which later withdrew its endorsement, as Minnesota law does not allow fusion candidates) and the Minnesota and National chapters of the Republican Liberty Caucus. Though included in neither the statewide caucus straw poll nor the party endorsement process, Jeffers challenged Governor Pawlenty for the Republican nomination in the September primary. Her running mate was Ruth Hendrycks.
 Tim Pawlenty, incumbent 39th Governor of Minnesota since 2003, former Majority Leader of the Minnesota House of Representatives (1999–2003), former State Representative from legislative district 38B (1993–2003), former Eagan City Councilor (1989–93), former member of the Eagan Planning Commission, attorney, and businessman. Pawlenty was endorsed by the state Republican party after winning the first ballot, unopposed. His running mate was incumbent 46th Lieutenant Governor of Minnesota (since 2003) Carol Molnau.

Results

Other candidates

Nominated by petition
 Walt E. Brown (Independent; used the ballot designation "Quit Raising Taxes"). Brown's running mate was Wesley C. Nelson.
 Leslie Davis (American). Davis's running mate was Gregory K. Soderberg.
 Ken Pentel (Green). Pentel's running mate was Danene Provencher.

Former candidates
 Jonathon "The Impaler" Sharkey (VWP) – Self-proclaimed vampire. Sharkey's campaign was jeopardized on January 30, 2006, when he was arrested in Princeton, Minnesota on felony charges stemming from allegations of stalking and flight, in Indiana. Sharkey's campaign website was taken down. It was discovered that the stalking charge had been dismissed on September 29, 2003, when Sharkey pleaded guilty to two counts of invasion of privacy and was ordered to submit to mental health treatment. At his trial on July 18, 2006, he was found not guilty of the felony escape charge. Nevertheless, Sharkey's arrest and jailing effectively terminated his campaign.

General election
On November 7, 2006, Tim Pawlenty narrowly won the general election, 46.7% to 45.7%, in a four-way race between himself, DFL candidate Mike Hatch, Independence Party candidate Peter Hutchinson, and Green Party candidate Ken Pentel. After Pawlenty opted out of spending limits, Hatch followed suit. Outspending Hatch by $1 million, Pawlenty's campaign set a new spending record for a Minnesota gubernatorial campaign. The race was also affected by negative advertising by 527 groups, as well as issue-oriented groups opposing liberal causes in the state.

A major issue in the campaign that was considered to have hurt the DFL nominees was lieutenant gubernatorial candidate Judi Dutcher's response to a question about E-85. When asked about the impact of the gasoline alternative on the economies of rural Minnesota by then KSAX-TV anchor Corey Poppe, Dutcher was unable to comment, asking Poppe to define E-85. In the subsequent questioning about her response, gubernatorial candidate Mike Hatch reportedly called a Forum Communications reporter "a Republican whore" and promptly hung up the phone. Hatch claimed he had said "hack", not "whore", but the incident, occurring only three days before the last poll listed in this article, is believed to have swung the race. It put Hatch on the defensive in the campaign's last week.

Additionally, Pawlenty made illegal immigration an issue, running ads accusing Hatch of trying to give illegal immigrants college tuition. Hatch responded with an ad saying that illegal immigration laws had not been enforced under Pawlenty's tenure. Pawlenty also ran ads accusing Hatch of being responsible for raising health care costs, a claim Hatch disputed. Pawlenty campaigned on a record of leading the state through hard times, balancing record budget deficits without raising major state tax rates or diminishing the state's "nation-leading" status on most socioeconomic indicators.

Pawlenty won by piling up large margins in suburban counties as well as in central and southern Minnesota regions anchored by St. Cloud and Rochester. In his victory speech, noting that he would have to deal with a DFL House and Senate, Pawlenty said it was "a time tonight to be humble and time to be grateful." He promised that "the next four years are going to be different than the last four years" and that he would build "a common agenda" with DFLers who swept legislative and constitutional offices.

Hatch ran ahead in Minneapolis, St. Paul and their inner-ring suburbs, and won by large margins around Duluth and the Iron Range. In his concession speech, Hatch advocated that legislators get back to "sitting down and getting to know each other in private" to establish common ground for bipartisan legislation, and called for an end to partisan rancor. Had the Hatch/Dutcher ticket been successful, he stated that this would have been one of his administration's first goals.

Predictions

Polling

Two-way

Three-way

Results

See also
U.S. gubernatorial elections, 2006
List of Minnesota gubernatorial elections

Notes

External links
Campaign Websites (Archived)
Kelly Doran for Governor
Mike Hatch for Governor 
Pam Ellison for Governor
Peter Hutchinson for Governor 
Sue Jeffers for Governor
Steve Kelley for Governor
Becky Lourey for Governor
Tim Pawlenty for Governor
Jonathon "The Impaler" Sharkey for Governor
Other
Minnesota Governor Candidates Directory and E-Debate- from E-Democracy.Org

Gubernatorial
2006
Minnesota